The Magra is a river in northern Italy.

Magra may also refer to:

Magra, California, an unincorporated community in California, United States
Magra, Tasmania, a locality in Tasmania, Australia
Magra Islet, a small island in Queensland, Australia
Magra District, a district in Algeria
Magra, Algeria, a town and commune in the Algerian district
Magra sheep, a breed of sheep found in India
Mogra, a village in the West Bengal state of India
Magra Church, Sweden

See also
Magras, a surname